The government effectiveness index is an index elaborated by the World Bank Group which measures the quality of public services, civil service, policy formulation, policy implementation and credibility of a government's commitment to raise these qualities or keeping them high. This index includes 193 countries ranked from -2.5 (less effective) to 2.5 (more effective). It is one in a broad set of government quality indicators.

The World Bank issues the government effectiveness index among other 5 worldwide governance indicators: voice and accountability, political stability, regulatory quality, rule of law and control of corruption. All these indexes are produced by Daniel Kaufmann, from the Natural Resource Governance Institute, and Aart Kraay, from the World Bank Development Research Group. These 6 indexes are considered as dimensions of governance.

Methodology
The government effectiveness index uses 47 variables (ranging from quality of bureaucracy to distribution infrastructure of goods and services) from 32 sources (ranging from African Development Bank to Global Insight Business Conditions and Risk Indicators). These variables are then rescaled and combined through the unobserved components model.

Significance
As an aggregate measure, the government effectiveness index does not allow to spot specific problems of a country or to analyse particular solutions, but it is a useful tool to compare countries in a broad sense, to measure the improvement of a particular country, or to ascertain trends.

Government effectiveness shows a high correlation with life satisfaction, GDP per capita and education expenditure. Guisan concludes that it fosters development.

See also
 Governance
 World Governance Index

References

Index numbers